Leconotide (INN; development codes CNSB004 and AM336; also known as ω-conotoxin CVID) is an ω-conotoxin peptide isolated from the venom of Conus catus which is under investigation as an analgesic drug for the treatment of pain conditions.

It acts as an N-type voltage-gated calcium channel (Cav2.2) blocker and is highly selective for this channel over the related P/Q-type voltage-gated calcium channel (Cav2.1).

Relative to ziconotide, leconotide is advantageous in that it is significantly less toxic, and for that reason can be administered intravenously as opposed to via intrathecal injection.

See also 
 Ziconotide, an analgesic peptide derived from the toxin of the cone snail species Conus magus
 Lacosamide, an approved small molecule analgesic and anti-epileptic
 Ralfinamide, an investigational small molecule analgesic

References 

Analgesics
Calcium channel blockers
Peptides